Low Rigg is a small hill located in the English Lake District a few miles east of the town of Keswick and slightly to the north of its larger neighbour High Rigg. It is a hill of modest elevation, being of insufficient size to merit inclusion in the famous Lake District guides produced by Alfred Wainwright. However, its position affords excellent views of the surrounding mountains such as Blencathra and Clough Head.

Geologically, Low Rigg is a lens-shaped laccolith consisting of an intrusion of a fine-grained granite.

The hill may be climbed in a short walk from either the Naddle Valley or St John's in the Vale. Low Rigg also possesses a feature not present on its larger neighbour, a body of water of reasonable size known as Tewet Tarn.

Fells of the Lake District